Nick Mantas (born 1983) is a Canadian politician who currently sits as a member of the Toronto City Council for Ward 22 Scarborough—Agincourt. Mantas was elected in a by-election held on January 15, 2021. Prior to his election, Mantas worked as a policy advisor and civil servant in the City of Toronto and federal government.

Background 
Mantas holds a Bachelor of Arts (BA) degree in economics from York University. He worked as a federal constituency assistant, a policy advisor to the Senate of Canada and chief of staff for Councillor Jim Karygiannis.

In 2014, following Karygiannis' resignation as a member of Parliament (MP) to run for Toronto City Council, Mantas sought the federal Liberal Party nomination for the Scarborough—Agincourt by-election.

Political career 
Mantas won a by-election to the Toronto City Council on January 15, 2021 and was sworn in on January 18. He replaces Jim Karygiannis, whom he had worked for at a federal and municipal level, serving as his chief of staff. On council, he sits as a member of the Scarborough Community Council.

Mantas campaigned on bringing traffic-calming measures to schools, increasing community safety, extending the Line 4 Sheppard subway into Scarborough and ensuring construction on the Bridletowne Hub starts in 2021.

Electoral results

See also 

 Politics of Toronto

References

External links 

 Personal website

Living people
Toronto city councillors
York University alumni
1983 births